Stephen Quinn Barncard (born January 24, 1947) is an American record producer and sound engineer. He is best known for his work producing rock albums of the 1970s, including the Grateful Dead's American Beauty and David Crosby's If I Could Only Remember My Name.

References
Discography at Discogs
Discography at mixstream website
Discography at Allmusic.com

External links
barncard.com – official website

1947 births
American record producers
Living people